Nessuno è solo (and its Spanish-language version Nadie está solo) is the third studio album released by Italian singer-songwriter Tiziano Ferro. The album was released in Italy on 23 June 2006 via EMI.

Nessuno è solo is preceded by the lead single "Stop! Dimentica", which became his third  number one single in Italy. The album contains a duet with Italian singer Biagio Antonacci ("Baciano le donne") and a tribute to singer and TV presenter Raffaella Carrà ("E Raffaella è mia").

It is Ferro's first album in three years after 111. According to the Federazione Industria Musicale Italiana (FIMI), Nessuno è solo was the best-selling album of 2007 in Italy. To promote the album, Ferro started the Nessuno è solo Tour 2007, which lasted from January to August 2007.

Track listing

Chart positions

Weekly charts

Year-end charts

Certifications 

|-
!scope="row"|Venezuela (APROFON)
|Gold
|5,000x
|-

References 

Tiziano Ferro albums
2006 albums
Italian-language albums
Spanish-language albums
EMI Records albums
Albums produced by Michele Canova